Man About Town is a 2006 comedy-drama film produced by Sunlight Productions and independently presented by Media 8 Entertainment. It was written and directed by Mike Binder and stars Ben Affleck, Rebecca Romijn, John Cleese, Bai Ling, and Jerry O'Connell in the Los Angeles area where the film was set.

In the United States, it was released direct-to-DVD on February 13, 2007; however, the film was theatrically released in many countries around the world.

Plot
Top Hollywood talent agent Jack Giamoro (Ben Affleck) seems to have it all: a successful career, a lot of money, a nice car, a beautiful wife, etc. However, while pursuing success, he somehow lost himself and neglected his marriage. He decides to take a journal writing class to do some self-searching. Jack's seemingly perfect world starts to unravel when he learns that his wife, Nina (Rebecca Romijn), is cheating on him with his most important client. Things get worse when Barbi (Bai Ling), an ambitious journalist, steals Jack's journal, which contains secrets that could ruin him personally and professionally. Jack is forced to fight for everything he has worked so hard to achieve and in doing so, he attains the self-insight he was looking for. By realizing that there is more to life than work, he begins to focus on what's most important in his life.

Cast

Soundtrack
 "Basic Instinct" – written by Jerry Goldsmith
 "Cucurrucucu Paloma" – written by Tomás Méndez; arranged and performed by Fredo Viola
 "I Got It" – written by John Krautner and Robert Harlow; performed by The Go
 "Our Lips Are Sealed" – written by Terrence Edward Hall and Jane Wiedlin; arranged and performed by Fredo Viola
 "Red States" – written and performed by Fredo Viola
 "The Sad Song" – written and performed by Fredo Viola

Home media
Lionsgate Entertainment distributed the film on DVD in the US.  The DVD included the bonus features "Visual Journaling", "Talk to My Agent", deleted scenes, and bloopers.  It contained a 16×9 widescreen version, 5.1 and 2.0 Dolby Digital audio, English and Spanish subtitles, and English closed captions.

External links

AMC Filmcritic

Yahoo! Movies

2006 films
2006 comedy-drama films
2006 independent films
2000s English-language films
Adultery in films
American comedy-drama films
American independent films
Films directed by Mike Binder
Films scored by Larry Groupé
Films shot in Vancouver
Lionsgate films
Sunlight Productions films
2000s American films